"Bia' Bia'" is a song by American hip hop group Lil Jon & The Eastside Boyz, released as the first single from their third studio album Put Yo Hood Up (2001), featuring rappers Ludacris, Too Short, Big Kap and Chyna Whyte.

Charts

References

Lil Jon songs
2001 singles
American hip hop songs
Ludacris songs
Too Short songs
2001 songs
Music videos directed by Bryan Barber
Songs written by Lil Jon
Songs written by Ludacris
Songs written by Too Short